Chickasaw County is a county located in the U.S. state of Iowa. As of the 2020 census, the population was 12,012. Its county seat is New Hampton. The county was named for the southern Indian Nation whose chief was Bradford.

History
Chickasaw County was founded in January 1851. It was named after the Chickasaw tribe, which lived in the Southern United States at the time.

The first nonindigenous settlers arrived in 1848 and the first county seat was from 1854 in Bradford, in the southwestern corner of the county. In the spring of 1857, the seat was moved to New Hampton, located near the geographic center, and was then called Chickasaw Center. The first county offices were housed in private houses and in the school building. The first courthouse, a wood-frame building, was erected in 1865. That building was enlarged in 1876, but a fire on March 26, 1880, destroyed it (townspeople managed to save the records). A brick/stone replacement structure was completed in 1881, and included a soaring clock tower. This building was enlarged in 1905 and again in 1906, but by the twenties it again was too small. The present structure, featuring Bedford stone, was built in 1929 and put into use in 1930.

Geography

Adjacent counties
Bremer County  (south)
Butler County  (southwest)
Fayette County  (southeast)
Floyd County  (west)
Howard County  (north)
Mitchell County  (northwest)
Winneshiek County  (northeast)

Highways
 U.S. Highway 18
 U.S. Highway 63
 U.S. Highway 218
 Iowa Highway 24
 Iowa Highway 27
 Iowa Highway 346

Demographics

2020 census
There were 5,534 housing units of which 5,022 were occupied.

2010 census
There were 5,679 housing units, of which 5,204 were occupied.

2000 census

As of the census of 2000, there were 13,095 people, 5,192 households, and 3,644 families residing in the county. The population density was 26 people per square mile (10/km2).  There were 5,593 housing units at an average density of 11 per square mile (4/km2). The racial makeup of the county was 98.75% White, 0.05% Black or African American, 0.03% Native American, 0.27% Asian, 0.01% Pacific Islander, 0.29% from other races, and 0.60% from two or more races. 0.63% of the population were Hispanic or Latino of any race.

There were 5,192 households, out of which 31.90% had children under the age of 18 living with them, 60.70% were married couples living together, 6.30% had a female householder with no husband present, and 29.80% were non-families. 26.10% of all households were made up of individuals, and 13.70% had someone living alone who was 65 years of age or older. The average household size was 2.48 and the average family size was 3.00.

In the county, the population was spread out, with 26.10% under the age of 18, 6.90% from 18 to 24, 25.60% from 25 to 44, 23.40% from 45 to 64, and 17.90% who were 65 years of age or older. The median age was 40 years. For every 100 females there were 100.10 males. For every 100 females age 18 and over, there were 96.50 males.

The median income for a household in the county was $37,649, and the median income for a family was $44,306. Males had a median income of $30,099 versus $21,309 for females. The per capita income for the county was $18,237. About 5.90% of families and 8.30% of the population were below the poverty line, including 9.90% of those under age 18 and 7.70% of those age 65 or over.

Chickasaw County posted the highest county unemployment rate in Iowa in the 2000 Census with 8% of the workforce unemployed. This figure, however, was still relatively low compared to the problems faced by many other counties in the Midwest.

Communities

Cities

Alta Vista
Bassett
Fredericksburg
Ionia
Lawler
Nashua
New Hampton
North Washington
Protivin

Unincorporated communities

Boyd
Bradford
Deerfield
Jerico
Little Turkey
Saude

Townships

 Bradford
 Chickasaw
 Dayton
 Deerfield
 Dresden
 Fredericksburg
 Jacksonville
 New Hampton
 Richland
 Stapleton
 Utica
 Washington

Population ranking
The population ranking of the following table is based on the 2020 census of Chickasaw County.

† county seat

Politics

See also

National Register of Historic Places listings in Chickasaw County, Iowa
The Chickasaw County Courthouse Article
Iowa GenWeb - Chickasaw County
Chickasaw County website

References

 
Iowa placenames of Native American origin
1851 establishments in Iowa
Populated places established in 1851